CHGS may refer to:

Schools 
 Crossley Heath Grammar School, in Halifax, England
 Cambridge House Grammar School, in Ballymena, Northern Ireland
 Central Hindu Girls School, in Bhelupur, Varanasi, India
 Chatham House Grammar School, in Ramsgate, England

Radio stations 
 CHGS (AM), now CJRW-FM, a radio station in Prince Edward Island, Canada
 CHGS-FM, an emergency broadcast radio station in Greenstone, Ontario, Canada

See also 
 CHG (disambiguation)